Melanie Gillman is an American queer non-binary cartoonist, illustrator, and lecturer, specializing in LGBTQ comics for Young Adult readers, including the webcomic As the Crow Flies. Their comics have been published by Boom! Studios, Iron Circus Comics, Lion Forge Comics, Slate, VICE, Prism Comics, Northwest Press, and The Nib.

Education 
Gillman received a Bachelor of Arts from the University of Colorado Boulder and a Master of Fine Arts from the Center for Cartoon Studies.

Career 
Gillman's first graphic novel Smbitten – about lesbians, swing-dancing, fancy hats, and vampires – was produced as part of their Masters thesis at the Center for Cartoon Studies. 

In 2012 they began As the Crow Flies, a webcomic about a 13-year-old African American queer girl who finds herself at an all-white Christian backpacking camp. The first volume of As the Crow Flies was funded through Kickstarter. The Amelia Bloomer Project named it as one of their 2019 top 10 books for readers from birth to age 18.  As the Crow Flies received the Stonewall Book Award Honor in 2018, was also nominated for the "Best Digital/Webcomic" Eisner Award in 2014 and the "Outstanding Comic" Ignatz Award in 2016. The Society of Illustrators awarded Gillman a gold medal for it.

Gillman began teaching Professional Practices at the California College of the Arts (CCA) in 2015, and was later appointed Senior Lecturer in Comics. They teach courses at the Rocky Mountain College of Art and Design and the Art Students' League of Denver, and have been a writing fellow with the Tulsa Artist Fellowship program since 2017.

Gillman was co-editor with Kori Michele Handwerker and a contributor to The Other Side, an anthology of 19 queer paranormal romance comics published in 2016. In 2016, they began writing an ongoing Steven Universe comics series for Boom! Studios.

Personal life 
Gillman lives in Tulsa, Oklahoma. Gillman is non-binary and uses the gender-neutral pronouns they and their.

Bibliography

Books 
As the Crow Flies (2017)

Care Bears Volume 1: Rainbow River Rescue (2016)

The Other Side: An Anthology of Queer Paranormal Romance (2016)

Steven Universe #1 (2017)

Steven Universe #2 (2017)

Steven Universe #3 (2017)

Steven Universe #4 (2017)

Steven Universe #8 (2017)

Steven Universe: Warp Tour (2017)

Steven Universe: Punching Up (2018)

References

External links
 
 Personal Tumblr blog
 Gumroad
 Patreon

Year of birth missing (living people)
Living people
American cartoonists
American webcomic creators
Non-binary artists
Non-binary writers
American LGBT artists
LGBT comics creators
LGBT people from Oklahoma
People from Tulsa, Oklahoma
Queer artists
Queer writers
University of Colorado Boulder alumni